Tragic Ceremony ( - lit. Extracted from the Secret Police Archives of a European Capital) is a 1972 horror film directed by Riccardo Freda (credited as Robert Hampton) and starring Camille Keaton, Tony Isbert, and Máximo Valverde. Its plot follows a group of young people who find themselves haunted in the hours after witnessing a black mass while lodging at a remote estate during a rainstorm.

The film received a limited theatrical release in Italy on 20 December 1972. In 2004 it was restored and shown as part of the retrospective "Storia Segreta del Cinema Italiano: Italian Kings of the Bs" at the 61st Venice International Film Festival. The film was never dubbed in English and it's distributed worldwide by Variety Distribution.

Plot 
After a day of sailing, a group of hippies—Jane, Bill, Joe, and Fred—are traveling through the English countryside when their car runs out of gasoline. In the midst of a rainstorm, they come across a large estate owned by Lord and Lady Alexander, who offer to refuel their car and invite them to spend the night.

Later in the evening, Jane hears music emanating from the basement, and goes to find the source. She uncovers a hidden chamber where the Alexanders are performing a black mass with multiple devil worshippers. When they realize she has infiltrated the event, they attempt to use her as a human sacrifice. Bill, Joe, and Sam go to find her, and begin fighting with the cultists. In a tussle, Bill stabs Lady Alexander in the stomach, killing her. The cultists, having lost their sacrifice, go berserk and attack each other with machetes and swords.

Jane, Bill, Joe, and Fred run to their car and escape the castle grounds, fleeing into the night. They arrive at Bill's mother's house later in the evening, but Bill's mother, angry over a missing necklace that Jane had earlier stolen, directs them to stay in a hotel. Instead, they take motorcycles to Bill's father's country house. On the nightly news, they watch as the massacre at the Alexanders' estate is covered by local media. In the news report, a broken necklace—the one Jane had stolen—as well as a guitar left behind by Bill, is noted as evidence, and it is also stated that Lady Alexander has gone missing. The police surmise that "hippies" may have been responsible, and liken the crime scene to the Tate murders.

After falling asleep upstairs, Fred awakens and finds Bill has vanished. He searches for him and finds his corpse in a closet. Later, Fred is found with his throat slashed in the bathroom. Jane and Joe flee the home, riding into the woods on a motorcycle. The two stop in a meadow to rest, and begin to kiss. Joe looks down at Jane, and sees the flesh around her mouth turn necrotic. Terrified, he flees on the motorcycle, but crashes into a pond. Jane appears at the edge of the pond, her face pale but mouth restored; Joe begs for her help, but she watches silently as he drowns.

Later, Jane is at a mental institution, where she is questioned by psychologists and doctors. In her room, she is confronted by an apparition of Lady Alexander, who stabs her to death. The apparition then leaves the hospital and enters a taxi, asking the driver to take her to the villa. It is implied that during the attempted sacrifice, Lady Alexander's spirit had taken over Jane's body and had been vying for control of it, thus murdering the three men.

Cast 

Camille Keaton as Jane
Tony Isbert as  Bill
Máximo Valverde as Joe
Giovanni Petrucci as Fred
Luigi Pistilli as Lord Alexander 
Luciana Paluzzi as Lady Alexander 
Irina Demick as Bill's mother 
 Paul Muller as Doctor 
 Beni Deus as Ferguson
 Milo Quesada as Cop
José Calvo as Gas Station Attendant

Production
Tragic Ceremony credits list José Gutiérrez Maesso and Leonardo Martin as screenwriters on the Spanish version of the film. They are credited strictly for co-production purposes.

Tragic Ceremony was shot on location in Spain, beginning in June 1972. According to film historian Roberto Curti, it is possible that a second director, named Fillipo Walter Ratti, was involved in shooting part of the film. Freda's daughter, Jacqueline, who was on the set, claimed her father was present for the entire filming process. However, Curti's assessment based on the original script for the film, surmises that at least two scenes were likely shot by Ratti: First, the scene in which Bill's corpse is discovered with his face tinted blue; and second, the scene in which Fred has his throat slashed in the bathroom. The film's special effects were provided by effects artist Carlo Rambaldi.

Release
Tragic Ceremony was given a limited theatrical release on 20 December 1972 in Italy, and later received a theatrical release in Spain in September 1974. The film did not receive a theatrical release in the United States.

In 2004, the film was restored and screened at the 61st Venice International Film Festival, after which the audience reportedly booed.

The film was released on DVD for the first time in North America on January 29, 2008 by Dark Sky Films.

In 2021, Tragic Ceremony was newly scanned & restored in 2k from its 35mm original camera negative and subsequently released on blu-ray as part of collection called Camille Keaton in Italy by Vinegar Syndrome.

Reception
Paper magazine gave the film a positive review, calling it a "truly rare Gothic Italian chiller" and a "groovy and gory gas." Maitland McDonough of TV Guide gave the film a middling review, noting: "An odd and not entirely successful genre hybrid, Freda's film is nonetheless of interest to fans of 1970s Euro-horror, and a welcome opportunity to see Camille Keaton play something other than a sexually abused woman-child." The New York Times called the film a "defiantly disjointed horror film," also noting: "The story is the archetypal one of a group of attractive young people lured into the lair of Devil worshipers, yet the violent consequences are unexpectedly imaginative, and the film's wanton neglect of narrative logic gives it an insinuating, dreamlike flow."

Jeremiah Kipp of Slant magazine gave the film a negative review, writing: "Tragic Ceremony starts out as a nondescript, frankly mundane Italian variation of the horror movie template where four kids having car trouble stop at a haunted house and find themselves kidnapped by a satanic cult ... These sporadic bursts of cult-movie oddness are amusing, but [the film] isn't scary enough to induce terror, unintentionally funny enough for camp, or bizarre enough for mad surrealism."

See also

List of Italian films of 1972

References

Works cited

External links

Tragic Ceremony at Variety Distribution

1972 films
1972 horror films
Films directed by Riccardo Freda
Films set in country houses
Films set in England
Haunted house films
Italian supernatural horror films
Films about Satanism
Films scored by Stelvio Cipriani
Films shot in Spain
1970s Italian films